Ludwig Merzbacher (9 February 1875 – 30 October 1942) was a German neuropathologist and psychiatrist born in Florence, Italy.

In 1900 he received his medical doctorate from the University of Strassburg, afterwards remaining in Strassburg as an assistant at the physiological institute. Later he worked at psychiatric clinics in Freiburg (1902–04) and Heidelberg (1904–06), obtaining his habilitation for psychiatry in 1906 at the University of Tübingen.

From 1906 until 1910 he worked at the psychiatric clinic in Tübingen, where he was an assistant to Robert Gaupp (1870–1953). During this time period, he also spent several months  in Munich, conducting research in the laboratory of Alois Alzheimer (1864–1915). Here he performed in-depth analysis on the reaction patterns of scavenger cells (reactive microglia).

In 1910 Merzbacher moved to Argentina, where he was appointed head of the laboratory in the psychiatric clinic at Buenos Aires. From 1914 to 1919 he was in charge of the department of pathological anatomy at the Clínica Modelö, and beginning in 1924, was chief physician at the "German hospital" in Buenos Aires.

He is remembered for his pathological studies of a dysmyelinating central nervous system disorder that is now referred to as "Pelizaeus–Merzbacher disease" (PMD). This eponymous disease is named along with German balneologist Friedrich Christoph Pelizaeus (1851–1942). Merzbacher described his research of the disorder in a 1910 paper titled Eine eigenartige familiärhereditäre Erkrankungform.

References

External links
 Ludwig Merzbacher @ Who Named It

19th-century German Jews
German neurologists
German psychiatrists
Physicians from Florence
1942 deaths
1875 births
German emigrants to Argentina